His Bitter Half is a 1950 Warner Bros. Merrie Melodies short, directed by Friz Freleng with a story by Tedd Pierce. The cartoon was released on May 20, 1950, and stars Daffy Duck. The voices are performed by Mel Blanc and Martha Wentworth.

Both His Bitter Half and Freleng's 1962 Yosemite Sam short Honey's Money have a similar plot: a fortune-seeking bachelor marrying an ugly mean widow, whose true personality is revealed only after the wedding, and, after forced to do backbreaking housechores, being made to care for her child, introduced (to both the main protagonist and the audience) only after the marriage is legalized. The child in both shorts is named Wentworth; here, Wentworth is a normal sized brat who causes trouble, with Daffy suffering the consequences of his son's actions. (In Honey's Money, Wentworth's heavy weight is a problem for Sam, but his attitude is friendly to Sam, who tries to get rid of him to keep the money for himself.) The differing personalities of the two Wentworths results in different executions for each cartoon.

His Bitter Half was reused as a clip in a 1986 TV special where Daffy tells his life's struggles in an attempt to produce a movie about Duck Dodgers.

Plot
Daffy learns that a "refined, lady duck" with an income is seeking someone to marry. After the requisite courtship and marriage, Daffy looks forward to a life of luxury. However, the woman—an oversized lady duck whose personality is as domineering as her size—immediately orders Daffy to do the housework; when Daffy objects, his bill is slapped off his face. After an afternoon of exhausting tasks, he is startled by the appearance of Wentworth, a rambunctious duckling whom Daffy wants nothing to do with.

After being scalped playing cowboys and Indians, Daffy, after being shown the bank book, is made to take Wentworth to the amusement park. There, Daffy tries his luck at a shooting gallery, but each time the duck takes a shot, Wentworth uses a slingshot to bean the back of the barker's head; eventually, the angry barker socks Daffy. His disgusted wife assumes that Daffy is "fried to the gills" and orders him to go to  bed, since he has got to help Wentworth shoot off fireworks on the Fourth of July. The holiday begins with Daffy taking the brunt of a fireworks mishap, followed by Wentworth disguising himself as a lit firecracker. Daffy, wanting to teach the brat a lesson, thinks he has found him and begins to discipline him—only to see the disguised Wentworth racing by, just seconds before the firecracker explodes.

The woman duck then demands that Daffy take Wentworth to the zoo. Despite a threat from his wife to pluck every feather from Daffy's body if he refuses, Daffy stands his ground, "No zoo.". He then walks out through the door with packed suitcases in hand, retorting, "Nobody's going to tell this little black duck what to do!". His body (below the shoulders) has been stripped clean of feathers, just as his now ex-wife had promised.  He does not look back.

References

External links

 

1950 animated films
1950 short films
1950 films
Merrie Melodies short films
Warner Bros. Cartoons animated short films
Daffy Duck films
Short films directed by Friz Freleng
Films scored by Carl Stalling
Films set in amusement parks
1950s Warner Bros. animated short films
1950s English-language films
Films about marriage